Terrence Hugh Hanratty (born January 19, 1948) is a former American football quarterback who played in college at Notre Dame and in the National Football League (NFL) during the 1960s and 1970s. He earned two Super Bowl rings as the backup quarterback for the Pittsburgh Steelers. Hanratty's son Conor also played football at Notre Dame as an offensive guard.

College career
Hanratty attended St. Paul Butler Catholic School and Butler Senior High School in western Pennsylvania, before attending the University of Notre Dame where he was a three-year starter and twice an All-American, as well as a Heisman Trophy candidate. Hanratty and Jim Seymour formed a passing/receiving duo leading Notre Dame to the national championship in 1966. Hanratty was also a teammate and friend of halfback Rocky Bleier at Notre Dame before the two were teammates in Pittsburgh.

Professional career
In 1969, Hanratty was selected in the second round of the NFL Draft by the Steelers' new head coach, Chuck Noll, and was the starting quarterback for a short time before losing the job to the Steelers' No. 1 1970 overall draft pick Terry Bradshaw. Hanratty was the last Pittsburgh-area native to start a game at quarterback for the Steelers, until Homestead native Charlie Batch filled in for an injured Ben Roethlisberger for two games during the team's Super Bowl-winning season in 2005. Hanratty suited up for Super Bowl IX, but did not see action. 

In 1975, Hanratty played in only one regular season game, for only two plays.  However, he played more in the postseason, getting into two playoff games.  In the AFC Championship Game he finished the game at quarterback, taking the Steelers' last two offensive snaps, after Bradshaw was hurt. He also finished Super Bowl X at quarterback in what turned out to be his last game as a Steeler, taking the team's last four offensive snaps.

Hanratty was placed on waivers by the Steelers in September 1976 and picked up in October by the expansion Tampa Bay Buccaneers, who infamously lost every game they played that season. As the backup quarterback to Steve Spurrier, Hanratty made a handful of appearances, and his sole start came in Week 13 against his old team, the Pittsburgh Steelers. Hanratty was pulled in favor of Spurrier after throwing just four passes: one was intercepted, two incomplete, and one caught for a one-yard loss. The 42–0 defeat was Hanratty's last appearance in the NFL; he retired after the 1976 season.

He finished his career with 2,510 passing yards, 24 touchdown passes, and 35 interceptions. He completed 38 percent of his pass attempts, which led to an overall quarterback rating of 43.0.

References

1948 births
Living people
All-American college football players
American football quarterbacks
Players of American football from Pennsylvania
Notre Dame Fighting Irish football players
Sportspeople from the Pittsburgh metropolitan area
Pittsburgh Steelers players
Tampa Bay Buccaneers players
People from Butler, Pennsylvania